The 1956 World Judo Championships were the 1st edition of the Men's World Judo Championships, and were held at the Kuramae Kokugikan in Tokyo, Japan on 3 May, 1956.

Medal overview

Men

Medal table

References

External links
 results on judoinside.com retrieved December 13, 2013

World Championships
World Championships 1956
Judo World Championships
1956
Judo World Championships 1956
Judo World Championships 1956
Judo World Championships
Judo World Championships 1956